Georgia Garnett (born 5 September 2001) is an Australian rules footballer who plays for Greater Western Sydney in the AFL Women's (AFLW).

AFLW career
Garnett was drafted by Greater Western Sydney in the 2019 AFL Women's draft with the 90th pick. After not playing in the 2020 season, Garnett made her debut in the 2021 season against Gold Coast. Finishing the season with seven appearances, she was selected for the 2021 22under22 team.

References

External links

 

Living people
2001 births
Greater Western Sydney Giants (AFLW) players
Australian rules footballers from New South Wales
Sportswomen from New South Wales